The Diocese of Lugano (Latin: Dioecesis Luganensis) is a Latin Church ecclesiastical territory or diocese of the Catholic Church in Switzerland covering the canton of Ticino. The diocese immediately exempt to the Holy See. In 2004, there were 233,017 baptised of 306,846 inhabitants. It is currently ruled by the Bishop Pier Giacomo Grampa and has as its principal patron St. Charles Borromeo, Archbishop of Milan, and as a secondary patron Saint Abundius, Bishop of Como.

History
The Diocese of Lugano was erected by a Bull of Leo XIII (7 September 1888). The territory covered is that of the Swiss canton of Ticino, where the population is almost entirely Catholic and Italian is the common language.

Before the Diocese of Lugano was founded the Canton of Ticino was under the jurisdiction, in ecclesiastical matters, of bishops who were not Swiss. The smaller, northern part belonged to the Archdiocese of Milan, and, consequently, still uses the Ambrosian Rite; the other, and much larger part of the canton, belonged to the Diocese of Como.

Soon after the formation of the Canton of Ticino, in 1803, efforts were made to separate it in its church relations as well as from foreign powers and to unite it in these with the rest of Switzerland. But it was several decades before the Great Council, in 1855, went thoroughly into the matter. Without consultation with the Holy See, the Federal Council in 1859 declared the jurisdiction of the Bishops of Como and Milan to be abolished in the territory of Switzerland; after this negotiations were begun with Rome. 

No settlement of the question was reached until the pontificate of Leo XIII. By the convention of 1 September 1884, made between the Curia and the Federal Council, Ticino was canonically separated from its former diocesan connections and was placed provisionally, under an administrator Apostolic, the pope appointing as administrator Bishop Lachat of Basle (see above). After Bishop Lachat's death (1886) the new Bishopric of Ticino was formed by the Bull of circumscription "" of Leo XIII (7 September 1888), and united with the Diocese of Basle under the title of the Diocese of Basle-Lugano. 

The same year the Church of San Lorenzo in Lugano was elevated to a cathedral. The union is merely a nominal one, for, although the Bishop of Basle is called the Bishop of Lugano he exercises no rights of jurisdiction in this diocese. It is, in reality, under the independent rule of an administrator Apostolic who has the rank and power of a bishop. 

He is appointed by the pope with the concurrence of the Bishop of Basle from among the members of the clergy of the Canton of Ticino. The first administrator Apostolic was Eugene Lachat; he was followed by Mgr. Vincent Molo (1887–1904), and Mgr. Alfred Peri-Morosini. The latter was born 12 March 1862, and was consecrated 17 April 1904.

On 8 March 1971 the apostolic administration of the Canton Ticino was separated from the diocese of Basel and by virtue of the Bull  of Pope Paul VI became an independent diocese. Giuseppe Martinoli became the first bishop of Lugano. From 1978 to 1986 he was bishop of Lugano Ernesto Togni, who was succeeded in 1986 Eugenio Corecco, under whose episcopate was formed the Academic Institute of Theology of Lugano, who became a decree of the Congregation for Catholic Education of 20 November 1993 a faculty of Theology.

The most noted church of the diocese is the Cathedral of San Lorenzo at Lugano, which was built in the fifteenth and sixteenth centuries and has a celebrated Renaissance façade; the most frequented place of pilgrimage is the shrine Madonna del Sasso not far from Locarno, which is the national shrine of the Canton of Ticino.

References

External links

Sito ufficiale della Diocesi Lugano—
Bolla Paroecialis et Collegialis

Lugano
Lugano
Religion in Ticino
Religious organizations established in 1888
1888 establishments in Switzerland
Lugano